John Peers and John-Patrick Smith won the final by defeating Nicholas Monroe and Simon Stadler 6–3, 6–2 in the final.

Seeds

Draw

Draw

References
 Main Draw

Campeonato Internacional de Tenis do Estado do Para - Doubles
2012 Doubles